Paul Drumaux (1883, in Hasselt – 1954, in Brussels) was a Belgian engineer who wrote on electricity, electrical engineering, and related subjects.

Paul Drumaux received from the University of Liège a degree in mining engineering in 1905 and a degree in electrical engineering in 1908. In 1907 Drumaxu became a supervising engineer at Belgium's PTT (Post, Telegraaf, Telefonie) and in 1919 a docent at Ghent University. He was an Invited Speaker of the ICM in 1932 in Zurich and in 1936 in Oslo.

His brother Leon Drumaux (1879–1942) became director-general of the Ministry of Agriculture of Belgium.

Selected publications
 La théorie corpusculaire de l’électricité. Les électrons et les ions (1911, publication awarded the Prix de la Fondations Montefiore) 166 pages
 La théléphonie à grande distance et la télephonie sans fils (1913, publication awarded the Prix de l’Association des Ingénieurs de Liège)
 Les circuits téléphonique à longue portée comparées aux lignes de transport de force (1913)
 L’évidence de la théorie d’Einstein (1923), 72 pages
 Sur l’énergie gravifique (1925)
 La théorie des quanta (1927).

References

1883 births
1954 deaths
20th-century Belgian engineers
University of Liège alumni
Academic staff of Ghent University
People from Hasselt
Belgian electrical engineers